Storm Rider is a 2013 American drama film written and directed by Craig Clyde and starring Kevin Sorbo, Kristy Swanson and C. Thomas Howell. It was filmed in Wallsburg, Utah.

Cast
Kevin Sorbo as Sam Fielding
Kristy Swanson as Jody Peterson
Danielle Chuchran as Dani Fielding
Jacob Buster as Jordan Fielding
Darien Willardson as Kevin Winslow
Sam Sorbo as Vanessa Fielding
Terence Goodman as Cameron Winslow
C. Thomas Howell as Mitch
Sarah Bernstein as Brooke
Jacque Grey as Marie Houghton
Amanda Swanson as Addy Jane
Joey Miyashima as Sheriff Kikuchi

Reception
Edwin L. Carpenter of The Dove Foundation gave it a positive review, writing that it "is well worth your time."  Tracy Moore of Common Sense Media gave the film two stars out of five.

References

External links
 
 

2013 films
American drama films
2013 drama films
Films about horses
2010s English-language films
2010s American films